Edwin Deacon (Ted) Etherington (December 25, 1924 – January 8, 2001) was an American writer, lawyer, and civil rights advocate, who served as president of the American Stock Exchange and Wesleyan University.

Biography
Etherington was born in Bayonne, New Jersey. He served in the Army during World War II, then graduated from Wesleyan in 1948 with a bachelor's degree in creative writing, and attended Yale University Law School, where he received a degree in 1952.

As a lawyer he specialized in banking and brokerage before working at the New York Stock Exchange, where he became vice-president.

Its reputation recently damaged by charges of mismanagement, in 1962 the American Stock Exchange named Etherington its president. At AMEX he was credited with improving opportunities for minorities and women. In 1967 he became president of Wesleyan, where he increased minority enrollment and restored a coeducational environment. Etherington was instrumental in the creation of the university's Center for African American Studies, its Center for the Arts, and a scholarship program for Connecticut community college graduates that bears his name.

In 1970 Etherington left Wesleyan to make an unsuccessful run for the United States Senate as a Republican candidate from Connecticut. He was appointed by President Richard M. Nixon to head the National Center for Voluntary Action.

References
Edwin Etherington, 76, Ex-Amex President, The New York Times, January 15, 2001
Wesleyan's Twelfth President
An Exceptional Character, CNN Money, January 12, 2001
Richard Nixon: "Statement About the Election of Edwin D. Etherington as President of the National Center for Voluntary Action," March 23, 1971. Online by Gerhard Peters and John T. Woolley, The American Presidency Project.

Presidents of Wesleyan University
American civil rights lawyers
Wesleyan University people
2001 deaths
1924 births
20th-century American academics